Protogoniomorpha anacardii, the clouded mother-of-pearl, is a species of Nymphalidae butterfly found in tropical Africa.

The wingspan is 55–68 mm for males and 65–75 mm for females.

Its flight period is year-round, peaking in summer and autumn.

The species larval food is Asystasia, Brillantaisia, Isoglossa, Justicia, Mimulopsis, and Paulowilhelmia species. Le salamis anarcadii est reconnaissable avec sa couleur blanche et ses deux grandes tâches noires sur le haut de ses ailes ainsi qu’à ses deux petites tâches en forme d’œil jaune et à son camouflage de feuilles.

Subspecies
P. a. anacardii — Sierra Leone, Ivory Coast, Ghana, Togo, western Nigeria, Central African Republic to the Rift Valley
P. a. ansorgei (Rothschild, 1904) — Angola, southern Democratic Republic of the Congo
P. a. nebulosa Trimen, 1881 — Democratic Republic of the Congo, Ethiopia, Kenya, Tanzania, Zambia, Mozambique, Zimbabwe, Botswana, South Africa, Eswatini, Yemen

Gallery

References

Junoniini
Butterflies described in 1758
Taxa named by Carl Linnaeus
Butterflies of Africa